Patrick Stewart Hodge, Lord Hodge, PC (born 19 May 1953) is a British lawyer, currently serving as Deputy President of the Supreme Court of the United Kingdom.

Early life
Hodge was educated at Croftinloan School, a private junior boarding school in Perthshire, and Trinity College, Glenalmond, also in Perthshire. He studied at Corpus Christi College, Cambridge (BA), and the University of Edinburgh School of Law (LLB), and worked as a civil servant at the Scottish Office between 1975 and 1978, before being admitted to the Faculty of Advocates in 1983.

Legal career
Hodge was appointed Standing Junior Counsel to the Department of Energy from 1989 to 1991, and to the Inland Revenue from 1991 to 1996, in which year he took silk. As a QC, his practice was mainly in commercial law, judicial review and property law. He served as a part-time Commissioner on the Scottish Law Commission from 1997–2003, and from 2000 to 2005 was a Judge of the Courts of Appeal of Jersey and Guernsey, and Procurator to the General Assembly of the Church of Scotland.

He was appointed a Senator of the College of Justice in 2005, taking the judicial courtesy title, Lord Hodge. Like all Scottish judges on the Supreme Court, he has sat in both the Court of Session and High Court of Justiciary, but had particular responsibility as the Exchequer judge in the Court of Session. On 1 October 2013, Hodge succeeded Lord Hope as a Justice of the Supreme Court of the United Kingdom. On 27 January 2020, Hodge was appointed Deputy President of the Supreme Court, succeeding Lord Reed who became President.

Hodge was nominated to Hong Kong’s Court of Final Appeal on 5 October 2020, where overseas judges are allowed to serve part-time in addition to appointments in their home jurisdictions. He assumed office on 1 January 2021 to fill the vacancy left by Australian judge James Spigelman who had quit because of the concern over the controversial national security law enacted by China. In a joint letter, a group of 32 lawmakers from both houses of the UK parliament raised concerns about Hodge’s appointment.

On 30 March 2022, he tendered his resignation as a Hong Kong judge, citing concerns about the national security law.

The Queen appointed Hodge to represent her as Lord High Commissioner to the Church of Scotland's 2022 General Assembly.

Personal life
Hodge married Penelope Jane Wigin in 1983, with whom he has two sons and a daughter. His interests include opera and skiing, and he is a member of Bruntsfield Links Golfing Society. He has been a Governor of Merchiston Castle School, Edinburgh, since 1998.

See also
List of Senators of the College of Justice

References

1953 births
Living people
People educated at Glenalmond College
Alumni of Corpus Christi College, Cambridge
Alumni of the University of Edinburgh School of Law
Deputy Presidents of the Supreme Court of the United Kingdom
Members of the Faculty of Advocates
Hodge
Scottish King's Counsel
20th-century King's Counsel
Scottish civil servants
Judges of the Supreme Court of the United Kingdom
Lords High Commissioner to the General Assembly of the Church of Scotland
Members of the Privy Council of the United Kingdom
Justices of the Court of Final Appeal (Hong Kong)
Hong Kong judges